Following British occupation of Iraq, very strict sodomy laws were put in place. These laws allowed discrimination, harassment, and murders of members within the Iraqi LGBT community. Once Iraqi independence was achieved, these laws still remained. In recent years, leaders within Iraq have spoken out about reducing sodomy laws within the country. Regardless of the reduced laws, discrimination, harassment, and murders of LGBT community members still persist.

Ancient Mesopotamia
In the Epic of Gilgamesh, which was composed in the Mesopotamian kingdom of Sumer, the relationship between the main protagonist Gilgamesh and the character Enkidu has been seen by some to be homosexual in nature.

Islam and medieval era
Islam became a major religion in the region following the first Arab conquest of the region in the 7th century. However, despite the prohibitory nature of Islamic doctrine against homosexuality, the presence of homosexuals in the region continued up to the present.

In the early Safavid era (1501–1723), when the Safavid empire ruled Mesopotamia from 1508–1533, male houses of prostitution (amrad khane) were legally recognized and paid taxes.

Ottoman and British rules
In 1858, the Ottoman Empire, which ruled the area of modern-day Iraq as part of Ottoman Iraq province, abolished its existing sodomy laws. The assumption of control over the three vilayets of the province by the British (as a League of Nations mandate known as the British Mandate of Mesopotamia) imposed anti-sodomy laws on the province which would remain well after independence in 1932.

Ba'athist era

While the British-era sodomy law may have still existed in Iraq after 1932, the 1969 Penal Code enacted by the Ba'athists only prohibited sexual activity that involved adultery, incest, public acts, prostitution, deception or force or persons under the age of eighteen years.   Homosexuality was not, per se, a criminal offense.

From the enactment of the Penal Code of 1969 - 2001, Iraqi security forces had considerably leeway, under the penal code, to harass, jail or even execute anyone deemed to be a threat to national security or public morality.  LGBT people could be harassed, jailed or blackmailed into becoming spies for the regime.   No LGBT-rights organization was allowed to exist in Iraq, and laws designed to specifically discriminate against LGBT people began to appear in the 1980s. In the summer of 1993 compulsory religious education was introduced into Iraqi schools. Nightclubs accused of harboring prostitutes were closed and the constitution was amended to include the death penalty for homosexuality.

The Iraqi Law of Personal Status was amended in the 1980s to specifically permit a wife to divorce her husband in cases where the husband was guilty of a homosexual relationship.  The practice of "honor killing" was also made legal in the family law code, which meant that LGBT people could be killed by a family member for bringing "shame" or "dishonor" to the family.

When the AIDS-HIV pandemic reached Iraq in 1986, Saddam Hussein believed that the disease could be spread by casual contact, and thus ordered all Iraqis with the disease to be relocated to a special prison facility.   Widespread ignorance about the disease meant that all Iraqis with hemophilia, along with homosexuals, were often suspected of carrying the disease. [Iraqi AIDS Patients Faced Confinement as Well as Pain and Death.  Ian Fisher.  New York Times.  Oct 2003]

After the war with Iran, Saddam Hussein felt the need to increase his support among Iraqis with more traditionalist Islamic social values.  One of the ways that the government achieved this was through strong, and public, opposition to LGBT people.

In the United Nations, the Iraqi delegation cited religion at the time as their reasoning for opposing efforts to have the international body support LGBT rights.  This was part of a larger campaign to reshape Saddam Hussein's image from that of a secularist, to that of champion of traditional Islamic morality.

In 1995, Saddam Hussein created a new military unit called, Fedayeen Saddam ("Saddam's Men of Sacrifice") to punish Iraqis whose behavior or life-style was deemed to be in violation traditional Islamic mores.  This group operated similar to an armed Mutaween (religious police), and often staged public torture and executions of LGBT people as women who had sex outside of marriage.

In 1999, an urban legend began to circulate that the Iraqi government banned the South Park television series, and feature film, because it depicted Saddam Hussein being involved in a homosexual relationship with Satan.   While the film would not have been approved by the Iraqi censorship board, western film makers did not attempt to exhibit films in Iraq because of the economic sanctions.

In 2001, the IRCC Resolution 234 of 2001 was enacted that established the death penalty for adultery, being involved with prostitution, and anyone who, "Commits the crime of sodomy with a male or female or who violates the honor of a male or female without his or her consent and under the threat of arm or by force in a way that the life of the victim (male or female) is threatened"

2003 Occupation of Iraq 
When Coalition Provisional Authority chief executive Paul Bremer took control of Iraq in 2003 he issued a series of decrees that restored the Iraqi criminal code back to its original 1969 edition, abolished the death penalty (which the newly formed Iraqi government restored in 2005), and removed most restrictions on free speech and assembly.

On February 5, 2006 the IRIN issued a report titled "Iraq: Male homosexuality still a taboo."  The article stated, among other things, that "honor killings" by Iraqis against a gay family member are common and given some legal protection.  The article also stated that the 2001 amendment to the criminal code stipulating the death penalty for homosexuality "has not been changed", even through Paul Bremer clearly ordered the criminal code to go back to its original 1969 edition.

Since 2005 there have been reports that the Supreme Council for the Islamic Revolution in Iraq's Badr Organization has been involved in death squad campaigns against LGBT Iraqi citizens, and that they are supported in these policies by the Grand Ayatollah Ali al-Sistani. New barbaric attacks, with 90 victims, are reported in the first months of 2012.

These reports seem to stem from a fatwa issued by Iraqi cleric Grand Ayatollah Ali al-Sistani stating that homosexuality and lesbianism are both "forbidden" and that they should be "Punished, in fact, killed. The people involved should be killed in the worst, most severe way of killing".

Early drafts in English of the 2005 Iraqi constitution contained a provision that asserted that none of the rights or liberties protected in the Constitution would apply to "deviants". Later revisions of the Iraqi Constitution removed the deviants clause. Several clauses throughout the revised document assert that Islam will be the foundation of the law and that various civil liberties shall be limited by "public morality".44

2010s
The so-called "emo" killings, in which as many as 70 teenagers accused of homosexuality on the basis of their clothing were murdered by Shiite death squads, were condemned by human rights groups outside of Iraq.

See also

 LGBT activism in Iraq
 LGBT rights in Iraq
 Murder of Doski Azad

References